Rainbow Harvest (born August 26, 1966) is an American actress best known for her roles as Karen in Old Enough, Megan Gordon in Mirror, Mirror, and Daryl Tarses in television sitcom series FM. She was active between 1983 to 1991 before leaving the acting profession to work behind the scenes until she eventually left the film industry entirely.

Early Life
Rainbow was born in New York City. She was accepted into the prestigious High School of Performing Arts, graduating in 1985. She took her first film role at age 16 playing a lead in Old Enough, released in 1984.

Filmography

Film

Television

Personal Life
Rainbow married actor Kevin Wixted whom she met filming the episode "Cory and Dean Got Married" of 21 Jump Street where both Rainbow and Kevin played the titular characters Cory and Dean. She would later retire from acting in 1991 to work behind the camera before leaving the film industry entirely. Since leaving the acting profession, Rainbow returned to Benedictine University to obtain a Bachelors in Art, Masters of Science in Management and Organizational Behavior. She would later receive a second Masters in Information Technology from Purdue University Global.

References

External links

1966 births
Living people
American film actresses
American television actresses
21st-century American women